Military tradition is the practices associated with the military or soldiers such as the styles of military uniform, drill, or the music of a military unit.

In the United States
In the United States, military tradition can refer simply to a father-son relationship or a much longer, ancestors-long line (which is the normal meaning). Military tradition refers to the tradition in a family to systematically destine one of its sons for a military career. This tradition is associated to the Southern United States who, as a whole, would have a military tradition. This is represented in the much higher representation of Southerners in the U.S. Military today and throughout the nation's history.

In Europe
In Europe, tradition was a principle of military culture that had evolved out of the Middle Ages' concept of chivalry. 

Within Europe a wide variety of separate military traditions developed until at least World War I. Subsequently major political and social changes have tended to break-down the historical continuity that had been a source of military tradition in many armies.

Since the late 1960s, a series of regimental mergers and disbandments have diluted British military tradition, although it still remains strong in the Guards Division.

In Prussia and the German Empire, states relied on their own history to maintain military traditions, although some specific regiments within elite formations did maintain distinctive customs and items of dress.  For example, one regiment, the Potsdam Grenadiers, consisted of extremely tall men. 

The French created the concept of Esprit de Corps, or pride in ones unit, within most elite or uniquely French units. North African units like the Zouaves, the Turcos, the French Foreign Legion, or even the Mamelukes which served in Napoleon Bonaparte's Imperial Guard developed distinctive styles of dress. Many of these distinctive styles were later adopted by the French Metropolitan Army during the nineteenth century.

In Japan

In Japan, most military tradition was based on the bushido code.  Bushido, translated as 'way of the warrior' in English, was the strict code of military discipline adhered to by Samurai warriors.

In fiction
Military Tradition is used in the strategy game Sid Meier's Civilization III, released by Atari, as a technological advance that allows the building of cavalry units.

Military Tradition is a game concept in the strategy game Europa Universalis IV released by Swedish PC strategy game designer, Paradox Interactive. In the game, a player-controlled faction can accumulate Military Tradition by engaging in land battle. A higher Military Tradition value results in the ability to recruit generals and conquistadors of better quality. 

Distinct elements of a military culture are also present in many fictional publications. These are often used as an important element in shaping fictional culture by authors. Military fiction is a key component of the "military and popular culture" subfield.

References